Darreh Lir may refer to:
Darreh Lir, Kohgiluyeh and Boyer-Ahmad
Darreh Lir, Khuzestan
Darreh Lir, Lorestan